Toronto, Canada's Festival of Fear is an annual multigenre fan convention that runs as part of Fan Expo Canada. It was founded as the Canadian National Horror Expo in 2004 by Rue Morgue Magazine and Hobby Star Marketing Inc. It is traditionally a three-day event (Friday through Sunday) typically held the weekend before Labour Day during the summer in Toronto, Canada, at the Metro Toronto Convention Centre. Since 2011 it has become a four-day-long event.

Originally showcasing novels, fantasy, film, television and related popular arts, the convention has expanded over the years to include a larger range of pop culture elements, such as horror, anime, manga, animation, toys, collectible card games, video games and web entertainment. The convention is the largest of its kind in Canada and among the largest in world, filling the entire south building of the Metro Toronto Convention Centre with over 91,000 attendees in 2012.

Along with panels, seminars, and workshops with industry professionals, there are previews of upcoming feature films, video game companies, and evening events such as The Masquerade; a costume contest, and other social receptions.

Typically there are over 175 hours of programming on all aspects of pop culture over the weekend.

History, locations and dates

See also
 The Murders in the Rue Morgue

External links
Rue Morgue Festival of Fear
Fearnet review of FOF 2007
 Phasers on stunned as Fan Expo Canada disappoints sci-fi devotees, The Toronto Star August 30, 2010

Horror conventions
Defunct multigenre conventions
Festivals in Toronto
Conventions in Canada
Science fiction conventions in Canada
Recurring events established in 2004
Summer events in Canada